The 93rd Assembly District of Wisconsin is one of 99 districts in the Wisconsin State Assembly.  Located in western Wisconsin, the district comprises almost all of Pierce County, as well as parts of Pepin County, western Eau Claire County, and southern Dunn County.  It contains the cities of Durand and Prescott as well as most of the city of River Falls and the villages of Bay City, Ellsworth, Elmwood, and Maiden Rock.  It includes the University of Wisconsin–River Falls campus and the River Falls campus of the Chippewa Valley Technical College.  The district is represented by Republican Warren Petryk, since January 2011.

The 93rd Assembly district is located within Wisconsin's 31st Senate district, along with the 91st and 92nd Assembly districts.

List of past representatives

References 

Wisconsin State Assembly districts
Buffalo County, Wisconsin
Dunn County, Wisconsin
Eau Claire County, Wisconsin
Jackson County, Wisconsin
Trempealeau County, Wisconsin